Sir John Osborn, 5th Baronet (3 December 1772 – 28 August 1848), of Chicksands Priory in Bedfordshire, was an English politician.

He was the only son of Sir George Osborn, 4th Baronet who he succeeded in 1818. He was educated at Westminster School and Christ Church, Oxford.

Osborn was Member of Parliament for Bedfordshire, 1794–1807; for Cockermouth, 1807–1808; for Queenborough, 1812–1818; again for Bedfordshire, 1818–1820 and for the Wigtown Burghs 1821–1824. He served as a Lord of the Admiralty from 1812 to 1824 and as one of the Commissioners of Audit from 1824 until his death. He was also made Colonel of the Bedfordshire Militia in 1805.

He died in 1848. He had married Frederica Louisa, the illegitimate daughter of Sir Charles Davers, 6th Baronet, with whom he had 5 sons and 3 daughters. He was succeeded in the baronetcy and family estates by his eldest son George Robert, the 6th baronet.

References 

 
 http://www.leighrayment.com/baronet.htm

External links 
 

1772 births
1848 deaths
People educated at Westminster School, London
Alumni of Christ Church, Oxford
Osborn, John, 5th Baronet
Lords of the Admiralty
Cumbria MPs
Members of the Parliament of Great Britain for English constituencies
British MPs 1790–1796
British MPs 1796–1800
Members of the Parliament of the United Kingdom for English constituencies
Members of the Parliament of the United Kingdom for Scottish constituencies
UK MPs 1801–1802
UK MPs 1802–1806
UK MPs 1806–1807
UK MPs 1807–1812
UK MPs 1812–1818
UK MPs 1818–1820
UK MPs 1820–1826